The following highways in Virginia have been known as State Route 81:

  State Route 81 (Virginia 1933–1940), Lodi to West Virginia
  State Route 81 (Virginia 1940–1958), now State Route 69
  Interstate 81 (Virginia), 1957–present